Otanche is a town and municipality in Boyacá Department, Colombia, part of the subregion of the Western Boyacá Province.

References

Municipalities of Boyacá Department